Operation Jaywick was a special operation undertaken in World War II. In September 1943, 14 commandos and sailors from the Allied Z Special Unit raided Japanese shipping in Singapore Harbour, sinking six ships.

Background 

Special Operations Australia (SOA), a combined Allied military intelligence organisation, was established in March 1942. SOA operated under the cover name Inter-Allied Services Department (IASD). It contained several British SOE officers who had escaped from Japanese occupied Singapore, and they formed the nucleus of the IASD, which was based in Melbourne. In June 1942, a commando arm was organised as Z Special Unit (which was later commonly known as Z Force). It drew its personnel primarily from the Australian Army and Royal Australian Navy.

In 1943, a 28-year-old British officer, Captain (later Major) Ivan Lyon (of the Allied Intelligence Bureau and Gordon Highlanders), and a 61-year-old Australian civilian, Bill Reynolds, devised a plan to attack Japanese shipping in Singapore Harbour. Commandos would travel to the harbour in a vessel disguised as an Asian fishing boat. They would then use folboats (collapsible canoes) to attach limpet mines to Japanese ships.

Initial training for the raid was organised and carried out by Major Lyon and Captain Davidson at Refuge Bay. The site selected was a remote, inaccessible area along the Hawkesbury River, New South Wales and named 'Camp X' for the purpose. Folboats were essential for training the prospective operatives, however only two; a one-man and a two-man were found to be suitable after a thorough search in Australia by Military personnel. These were bought on the spot from the folboat builder Walter Hoehn after a test run on the Yarra River, Alphington by the head of the Inter Allied Services Department Colonel Mott and Major Moneypenny. A wooden rigid canoe was also built for Camp-X by trainees under the supervision of Davidson.

Reynolds was in possession of a  Japanese coastal fish carrier, Kofuku Maru 幸福丸, which he had used to evacuate refugees from Singapore. Lyon ordered that the boat be shipped from India to Australia. Upon its arrival, he renamed the vessel Krait, after the small but deadly Asian snake.

The attack 

In mid-1943, Krait travelled from a training camp at Broken Bay, New South Wales to Thursday Island. Aboard was a complement from Z Special Unit of three British and eleven Australian personnel, comprising:

 Major Ivan Lyon (Mission Commander)
 Lieutenant Hubert Edward Carse (Kraits captain)
 Lieutenant Donald Montague Noel Davidson
 Lieutenant Robert Charles Page
 Corporal Andrew Anthony Crilly
 Corporal R.G. Morris
 Leading Seaman Kevin Patrick Cain
 Leading Stoker James Patrick McDowell
 Leading Telegraphist Horace Stewart Young
 Able Seaman Walter Gordon Falls
 Able Seaman Mostyn Berryman
 Able Seaman Frederick Walter Lota Marsh
 Able Seaman Arthur Walter Jones
 Able Seaman Andrew William George Huston

On 13 August 1943, Krait left Thursday Island for Exmouth Gulf, Western Australia, where it was refuelled and repairs were undertaken. Not only did the repairs cause delays in departure, but the folboats, manufactured by Harris Lebus and designated as model MKI**, which had been specially ordered for the attack by Lyon from England only arrived at the last minute. They were found to be faulty, lacked some important parts and were not according to the design that Davidson had specified. They had to undergo many on-the-spot changes simply to make each framework fit together and then fit correctly into the outer skins. This left the crew little time to get accustomed to them before being loaded on to Krait.
 
On 2 September 1943, Krait left Exmouth Gulf and departed for Singapore. The team's safety depended on maintaining the disguise of a local fishing boat. The men stained their skin brown with dye to appear more Asiatic and were meticulous in what sort of rubbish they threw overboard, lest a trail of European garbage arouse suspicion. After a relatively uneventful voyage, Krait arrived off Singapore on 24 September. That night, six men left the boat and paddled  with folboats (collapsible canoes) to establish a forward base in a cave on a small island near the harbour. On the night of 26 September 1943, they paddled into the harbour and placed limpet mines on several Japanese ships before returning to their hiding spot.

In the resulting explosions, the limpet mines allegedly sank or seriously damaged seven Japanese ships, comprising over 39,000 tons between them. The commandos waited until the commotion over the attack had subsided and then returned to Krait, which they reached on 2 October. Their return to Australia was mostly uneventful, except for a tense incident in the Lombok Strait when the ship was closely approached by a Japanese auxiliary minesweeper Wa-102 on patrol; however Krait was not challenged. On 19 October, the ship and crew arrived safely back at Exmouth Gulf.

Recent analysis of results
Recent analysis of Japanese records and radio decrypts have identified only 6 ships sunk or damaged. Japanese radio messages only reference six ships attacked, and it is highly probable the attack on the seventh failed.

The often repeated claim that the saboteurs sank the large high speed tanker Shinkoku Maru (Sinkoku Maru in kokutai spelling) is not supported by Japanese records that clearly show the ship leaving Truk (Chuuk), Carolines Islands on the day of the attack.

Raid repercussions 

The raid took the Japanese authorities in Singapore completely by surprise. Never suspecting such an attack could be mounted from Australia, they assumed it had been carried out by local saboteurs, most likely pro-Communist Chinese guerillas. In their efforts to uncover the perpetrators, a wave of arrests, torture and executions began. Local Chinese and Malays, as well as interned POWs and European civilians were targeted in this programme. The incident became known as the Double Tenth, for 10 October, the day that Japanese secret police began the mass arrests.

Given the effects inflicted upon the local population by the Japanese, criticism has arisen as to whether Operation Jaywick was justified, especially with its relatively limited strategic results. In the aftermath of the raid, the Allies never claimed responsibility for the attack on shipping, most likely because they wanted to preserve the secret of Krait for future similar missions. Therefore, the Japanese did not divert significant military resources to defending against such attacks, instead just using their secret police to enact reprisals against civilians.

Operation Jaywick was followed by Operation Rimau. Although three ships are sometimes claimed as sunk in this raid, no corroboration of this has ever been found and in all likelihood no vessels were sunk; but the participants, including Lyon, were either killed in action or captured and executed.

Popular culture 

Australian novelist Ronald McKie wrote an account of the operation in 1961 titled "The Heroes". In 1989, a British/Australian miniseries dramatized McKie's book. The Heroes was directed by Donald Crombie, with the cast including Paul Rhys as Ivan Lyon, John Bach as Donald Davidson and Jason Donovan as 'Happy' Houston.

See also 
Operation Frankton

References

Bibliography
 Cundall, Peter (2018) "Operation Jaywick: A Reassessment of Results", The Log: Quarterly Journal of Nautical Association of Australia, Vol 51, No.2, Issue 212, p.68. Also published as "Operation Jaywick: A Reassessment of Results" on Combined Fleet website
Hoehn, John. (2011). Commando Kayak: The Role of Australian Folboats in the Pacific Campaign. Hirsch Publishing. 
National Archives of Australia, A3269, E2A, 1944, p. 34.
Silver, Lynette Ramsay. (2001). Krait: The Fishing Boat that Went to War. Cultured Lotus. .
Wynyard, Noel. (1947). "Winning Hazard". Sampson Low, Marston & Co.

External links 

 Peter Dunn, 2005, "'Z' Special Unit in Australia During WW2" (ozatwar.com)
 Interview with Horrie Young in the Australians At War Film Archive
 HNSA Ship Page: Krait
 Operation Jaywick, Australian War Memorial

Conflicts in 1943
Battles and operations of World War II
British rule in Singapore
Japanese occupation of Singapore
Military operations of World War II involving Australia
Special forces of Australia
Military history of Singapore
1943 in Singapore
World War II British Commando raids
Military history of Malaya during World War II